Losolyn Laagan (1887 - May 4, 1940) was a Mongolian politician and member of the Mongolian People's Revolutionary Party (MPRP) who served as chairman of the Presidium of the State Little Hural (titular Head of state of Mongolia) from April 27, 1930, to June 2, 1932.

Biography
Lagaan was born in 1887 in Buyant Sum, Khovd Province. He joined the MPRP in 1923 and two years later was appointed chairman of the Auditing Committee of the Committee of the MPRP for Khovd Province. In 1928 he was named chairman of the Central Auditing Commission of the national MPRP.  In March 1930 he was elected a member of the Central Committee of the MPRP Presidium and on April 27, 1930, was named Chairman of the Presidium of the State Little Hural of the MPR, or titular Head of State of the Mongolian People's Republic, a position he would hold until June 2, 1932.

In spring 1932, Laagan was one of several political leaders blamed for excesses of what was later termed the "Leftist Deviation," during which the government actively pursued Soviet tailored policies to force herders onto collective farms, suppress private trade, and seize property of both the nobility and the Buddhist church.  The harsh policies resulted in violent uprisings that spread across western Mongolia.  Lagaan and several other leading politicians were officially expelled from the party in May 1932 and Laagan was removed from his position as Chairman of the Presidium of the State Little Hural a month later and demoted to a minor civil service position in his native Khovd Province.

Laagan was one of the earliest government officials arrested during Khorloogiin Choibalsan's Great Terror (1937-1939).  He was arrested in September 1937 on charges of counterrevolutionary activities. Sentenced to death on May 4, 1940, he executed on the same day.

Losolyn Laagan was rehabilitated in 1962.

Speakers of the State Great Khural
Mongolian People's Party politicians
Mongolian communists
Heads of state of Mongolia
Communism in Mongolia
1887 births
1940 deaths
People from Khovd Province
Executed Mongolian people
Great Purge victims from Mongolia
Executed communists